Elduain is a village in the province of Gipuzkoa, in the autonomous community of the Basque Country, northern Spain. It is situated in the Leitzaran valley, some 32 km south of San Sebastián. The municipality has a population of 239 (2014) and covers an area of 25 km². It was founded in 1614.

References

External links
 Official Website Information available in Spanish and Basque.
 ELDUAIN in the Bernardo Estornés Lasa - Auñamendi Encyclopedia (Euskomedia Fundazioa) Information available in Spanish

Municipalities in Gipuzkoa